Martin Lee "Marty" Mason (born April 4, 1958 in Central City, Kentucky) is a retired minor league baseball pitcher and former Major League Baseball bullpen coach for the St. Louis Cardinals.

Mason pitched in the minor leagues from 1980 through 1986 in the New York Yankees and Cardinals organizations.

After retiring as a player, Mason remained with the Cardinals organization as a minor league pitching coach from 1987 through 1999. In 2000, he became the bullpen coach for the Cardinals.  Mason was dismissed following the 2010 season.

Mason spent the next two years as a pitching coach in the Chicago Cubs organization. On November 17, 2012, Mason was announced as the pitching coach for the Minnesota Twins Triple-A affiliate Rochester.

References

External links

Marty Mason St. Louis Cardinals Bio

1958 births
Living people
People from Central City, Kentucky
St. Louis Cardinals coaches
Major League Baseball bullpen coaches
Oneonta Yankees players
Greensboro Hornets players
Springfield Cardinals players
Arkansas Travelers players
St. Petersburg Cardinals players